</noinclude>

Daniel Pérez Moreno (born 17 July 1981), commonly known as Tonino, is a Spanish former footballer who played as a midfielder.

Club career
Tonino was born in Guardamar del Segura, Province of Alicante. During his career, in which he did not arrive in the second division until the age of 28, he represented Real Murcia Imperial, Orihuela CF (two spells), Elche CF Ilicitano, CD Molinense, CD Alone – in his hometown – FC Torrevieja, CD Alcoyano, FC Cartagena (two stints), CD Leganés, Crevillente Deportivo and CD Almoradí.

Tonino made his debut as a professional on 29 August 2009 whilst at the service of Cartagena, coming on as a 75th minute substitute in a 1–0 away win against Girona FC. It was one of only five appearances in the second tier.

References

External links

1981 births
Living people
People from Vega Baja del Segura
Sportspeople from the Province of Alicante
Spanish footballers
Footballers from the Valencian Community
Association football midfielders
Segunda División players
Segunda División B players
Tercera División players
Divisiones Regionales de Fútbol players
Real Murcia Imperial players
Orihuela CF players
Elche CF Ilicitano footballers
CD Torrevieja players
CD Alcoyano footballers
FC Cartagena footballers
CD Leganés players